Lo-Fantasy is the fifth studio album by Canadian rock musician Sam Roberts, and the second released as "Sam Roberts Band". The album debuted at number 3 on the Canadian Albums Chart, selling 5,800 copies during its first week. The album was nominated for "Rock Album of the Year" at the 2015 Juno Awards.

Promotion
On September 16, 2014, Roberts announced a 16-city worldwide tour to promote the album, beginning at The Garage in London and finishing at Rogers K-Rock Centre in Kingston with fellow Canadian band Besnard Lakes as a supporting act.

Critical reception

Lo-Fantasy received generally favorable reviews but music critics were mixed on the uses from the electronic genre throughout the album. At Metacritic, which assigns a normalized rating out of 100 to reviews from mainstream critics, the album received an average score of 71, based on 4 reviews.

AllMusic writer Matt Collar called it "a melodic, psych-inflected album that showcases Roberts' knack for mixing gigantic, propulsive rock melodies and dance-oriented hooks", saying that its "at once organically rootsy and studio sophisticated, with songs that straddle the line between stadium shouters ("We're All in This Together") and midtempo club anthems ("The Hands of Love")." Matthew Riddle from Exclaim! commended the mixture of Roberts' "trademark arena-rock choruses and anthemic growls" through various dance genre filters. He said of Roberts' detractors: "those willing to get past their preconceived notions may be surprised to find that Lo-Fantasy is perhaps the most dynamic recording of Roberts' career." Joshua Kloke of NOW noted how the record utilizes a combination of the "wandering vibe" from Chemical City and the "jazzy feel" of Collider, saying that it can be "airy and middling" at times. He concluded that "Thankfully, though, Roberts is less concerned with sticking to a chunky, riff-driven formula than with experimenting with the many layers that he and his band are capable of producing." In a negative review for Slant Magazine, Kyle Fowle found the electronic elements "overbearing", with each track containing "stale production flourishes and gratuitous layers of reverb." He concluded that the record "attempts to skate by on pure surface appeal in order to distract from the obtuse social commentary at its core."

Track listing

Personnel
Credits adapted from the liner notes of Lo-Fantasy.
Sam Roberts Band
Sam Roberts - lead vocals, guitar
James Hall - bass
Eric Fares - keyboards, synthesizers
Dave Nugent - guitar, backing vocals
Josh Trager - drums

Additional musicians
Chet Doxas - saxophone (on "We're All In This Together", "Never Enough", "Golden Hour")
Tim Fletcher - backing vocals (on "We're All In This Together")

Artwork
Simon Paul - art direction and design
Jan Verburg - interior image design

References

2014 albums
Sam Roberts albums
Universal Music Canada albums
Albums produced by Youth (musician)